myDeejay is an Italian music television channel. It launched on October 1, 2009 as a pay-television service on Sky Italia.

External links 
  

Music television channels
Television channels in Italy
GEDI Gruppo Editoriale
Italian-language television stations
Television channels and stations established in 2009
Music organisations based in Italy

de:My Deejay